Jalan Kawasan Perindustrian Rawang, Federal Route 3209 is an industrial federal roads in Selangor, Malaysia. This 3.1-km industrial federal road connects Rawang Interchange in the west to Rawang in the east.

The Kilometre Zero is located at Rawang, at its interchange with the Federal Route 1, the main trunk road of the central of Peninsular Malaysia.

At most sections, the Federal Route 3209 was built under the JKR R5 road standard, allowing maximum speed limit of up to 90 km/h.

There is one overlap: B29 – Jalan Rawang–Bestari Jaya (from Rawang town centre to Bestari Jaya).

List of interchanges

References

Malaysian Federal Roads